Ilse Gradwohl (born 1943 in Gleisdorf, Austria) is a Mexican painter. She was born in Austria, but moved to Mexico in 1973, where she studied art at the National Autonomous University of Mexico (UNAM). In 1996 she had a solo exhibition at the Museo de Arte Moderno in Mexico City entitled Mnesis.

References 

Living people
1943 births
20th-century Mexican painters
21st-century Mexican painters
Austrian emigrants to Mexico
Mexican women painters
20th-century Mexican women artists
21st-century Mexican women artists